Gender Equity Education Act of Taiwan was enacted on June 23, 2004. The General Provisions states the purposes of the act: "to promote substantive gender equality, eliminate gender discrimination, uphold human dignity, and improve and establish education resources and environment of gender equality." In recent years, this act has become controversial because it has implemented anti-discrimination on LGBT rights and LGBT sex education.

Content
(Note: this is not an exact quotation)

General Provisions
The chapter states that the central competent authority is Ministry of Education, and local competent authorities are city government, etc.

All competent authorities and schools shall have a "gender equity education committee", whose tasks include promoting curricula, teaching, and assessments on gender equity education.

At least half of the members of such a committee shall be women, and at least two thirds of the members shall be experts in the area.

This chapter specifically defines "sexual assault or sexual harassment on campus" as  "sexual assault or sexual harassment that involves the school principal, faculty, staff or student as one party and student as the other party", separate these events from others.

Learning environment and resources
The chapter states
 The school shall not discriminate in its teaching, assessments, etc. against students on the basis of their gender or sexual orientation. But shall affirmatively provide assistance to students who are disadvantaged due to those (such as lesbian, gay, bisexual transgender, and pregnant students) in order to improve their situation.
 The admission acceptance shall be gender neutral, except schools with historical tradition or other reasons. (Many famous schools in Taiwan are single-sex)
 Faculty shall be given gender equity courses before and during career.
 The school shall build safe campus, such as safer toilets.
 The chapter specifically states the school shall affirmatively protect pregnant students' right to education.
 At least one-third of members shall consist of either sex, in Staff Appraisal Committee and similar organization of schools, unless members either sex are too few.

Curriculum, teaching materials and instruction
Curricula shall cover gender equity education. The school shall develop relevant plan and assessments. All curricula shall comply with principle of gender equity. All teachers shall maintain gender equity consciousness, and "shall encourage students to take courses in fields that are not traditionally affiliated with their gender".

The Enforcement Rules for the act further states that gender equity education curricula shall cover "affective education, sex education, and gay and lesbian education".

Prevention and handling of sexual assault and sexual harassment on campus
 When handling such a case, the school shall report according to relevant laws, and turn the case to its gender equity education committee.
 The party's and offense-reporter's identities shall be kept confidential.
 The victim shall be informed with rights, and provided with protection measures if necessary.

Application for investigation and relief
If the school violates the act, victim can apply for investigation to the supervising authority.

History
The act originated from Taiwanese local feminism movement in 1980s, began to be drawn in 2000, and was announced in 2004.

Origin
The act originated from earlier demands of "sex equality" (literally translated as "Equality of two sex") education. 1988, Awakening Foundation published a handbook, which examined the official edition of textbooks of primary and high schools on language and social science, and concluded them full of gender stereotypes.

1996, following then policy of educational reforms, Awakening Foundation presented the Education Reform Council of Executive Yuan with five demands:
 Improve textbooks
 Train faculty
 Establish gender equality committee
 Increase women's participation in decision making
 Set up women studies curricula
The first four demands became the content of Gender Equity Education Act.

In the end of the same year, Sexual Assault Prevention Act was passed quickly because of the shock of the rape-murder case of a feminist Peng Wan-ru. The act states that primary and high schools shall have "gender equality education". This is the legal basis of Gender Equity Education Act. In March 1997, the Ministry of Education established the "Gender Equality Education Committee", which later gave rise to the act.

In 1999, the Ministry of Education passed the executive order of "Principles of Handling Sexual Assault or Sexual Harassment on College Campus, Primary and Secondary Schools". Schools followed order to establish rules and taskforces.

Design and legislation
In 2000, "Gender Equality Education Committee" commended Chen Hwei-shin, Shen Mei-chen, Su Chien-ling and Hsieh Hsiao-chin to draw the draft of "Gender Equality Education Act". The draft was completed in 2001. The draft contained all five chapters of the Gender Equity Education Act.

In this version, there is work protection of pregnant faculty and staff in the chapter about learning environment, but not in that chapter of Gender Equity Education Act, because such protection has been given by "Gender Equality In Employment Law".

During the draft the committee was shocked by the death of student Yeh Yung-chih, who was later considered as having Gender dysphoria. Thus the committee concerned more on gender, sexual orientation, and sexual identity, and in 2002 changed the name of the act from "Gender Equality" (literally translated as "Equality of two sex") to "Gender Equity" .

The draft of Gender Equity Education Act was completed in May 2003, passed Executive Yuan meeting on March 31, 2004, and then entered stage of legislation.

The "NGO League of Promoting Gender Equity Education Act" (性別平等敎育法民間推動聯盟) was then formed. It included Awakening Foundation, and Taiwan Tongzhi Hotline Association. June 4, The act was passed in Legislative Yuan, and on June 23, it was announced by the president.

Implementation

Before the act was announced, there were already many training and curriculum studies. After the announcement, all training and studies were based on the act.
Taiwan Tongzhi Hotline Association has been hosting  "Understanding LGBT" workshop for teachers since 2000.

There are also some schools combined previous sex education and abstinence education (run by religious groups in public schools) such as showcasing a documentary of abortion as their version of gender equity education. The official course contents regulation "Index of Capabilities" is still under studies in March 2006.

All public schools had established committees according to the act, religious private schools may get exemptions.

Although the "violence from ex-lovers" was not addressed in the draft of the act, major criminal cases of such violence are still occurring. And there are people who wish the act would result more affective education to reduce such violence.

On March 30, 2006, Ministry of Education ruled that any campus-wide competition or selection campaign (such as beauty contest) must summit project to the gender equity commission of the school. And if the campaign violate the regulation of gender discrimination of the act, the campaign would be corrected.

See also

 Education in Taiwan
 Global Gender Gap Report
 Gender equality
 Gender mainstreaming
 Sexual harassment and sexual assault
 Gender discrimination
 LGBT rights in Taiwan
 Women's Educational Equity Act in USA

References

 Gender Equity Education Act
 Enforcement Rules for the Gender Equity Education Act

In Chinese :
  兩性平等教育法草案
 蘇芊玲，台灣推動兩性平等教育的回顧與前瞻，「兩性平等教育季刊」，第十四 期，2001年2月，頁13-18。（網路上的檔案，MS Word格式）
 性別平等教育法民間推動聯盟，「性別平等新校園　 亟待立法來成全」性別平等教育法推法座談會
 翁翠萍，教育部:全校競賽選拔若性別歧視是違反性平法，2006年3月30日，中央社。

External links
 Key Figures for Calculating Composite Gender Equality Index
 Taiwan gender equality ranked 2nd globally due to political engagement: DGBAS
 The problems with English teaching in Taiwan
 40% of foreign teachers may have fake credentials: report
 Education - Reform Fattens Cram School Coffers
 Solutions to Taiwan's Education Woes - The Government: Five Urgent Tasks
 Education Reform - Excellent Teachers Nurture Creative Students
 Taiwan's vocational education must be reformed
 Here's Why Trade Schools Continue to Suck So Badly
 Taiwan elects first female president
 教育部性別平等教育全球資訊網

Politics of Taiwan
Gender equality
Education in Taiwan
2004 in law
Law of Taiwan
LGBT rights in Taiwan